Bridge Creek is a stream in Knox and Lewis counties of the U.S. state of Missouri. It is a tributary of the Middle Fabius River.

Bridge Creek was named for a covered bridge near its mouth.

See also
List of rivers of Missouri

References

Rivers of Knox County, Missouri
Rivers of Lewis County, Missouri
Rivers of Missouri